Senillé is a former commune in the Vienne department in western France. On 1 January 2016, it was merged into the new commune Senillé-Saint-Sauveur.

Demographics

See also
Communes of the Vienne department

References

Former communes of Vienne